is a Japanese manga series written and illustrated by Hiroyuki Nishimori. It was serialized in Shogakukan's Weekly Shōnen Sunday from February 2016 to December 2017, with its chapters collected in eight tankōbon volumes.

Publication
Hiiragi-sama wa Jibun wo Sagashiteiru., written and illustrated by Hiroyuki Nishimori, was serialized in Shogakukan's shōnen manga magazine Weekly Shōnen Sunday from 3 February 2016 to 27 December 2017. An additional chapter was published in the magazine on 14 February 2018. Shogakukan collected its chapters in eight  tankōbon volumes, released from 12 July 2016 to 16 March 2018.

Volume list

Reception
Hiiragi-sama wa Jibun wo Sagashiteiru. volumes were featured on Oricon's weekly chart of the best-selling manga; volume 1 debuted #27 (23,563 copies sold); volume 2 debuted #36 (25,981 copies sold); volume 3 debuted #44 (14,444 copies sold); volume 4 debuted #36 (15,055 copies sold).

References

External links
  
 

Comedy anime and manga
School life in anime and manga
Shogakukan manga
Shōnen manga
Slice of life anime and manga